The Joint Graduate School of Energy and Environment (JGSEE) is an autonomous graduate school, operating as a consortium of five Thai universities. Established in 1998, it aims to be an internationally recognized premier centre in graduate education and research in the fields of energy and environmental technologies. The school receives funding from the Thai government through the CHE–ADB Higher Education Development Project and the Energy Conservation Promotion Fund of Thailand's Ministry of Energy.

Consortium
The school operates as a consortium involving King Mongkut's University of Technology Thonburi with partners from
 King Mongkut's Institute of Technology North Bangkok
 Chiang Mai University
 Sirindhorn International Institute of Technology at Thammasat University
 Prince of Songkhla University

Academic programs
JGSEE offers three study programs leading to the degrees of :
 Master of Science (MSc)
 Master of Engineering (MEng)
 Research-based Master of Philosophy (MPhil)
 Doctor of Philosophy (PhD)

All programs are conducted in English by highly qualified local and international academic staff. The school operates on a bi-semester basis. Having completed the first semester of course work, students may choose to undertake their thesis study at any of the five partner institutions.

See also
 List of universities in Thailand

External links

 JGSEE

University departments in Thailand
Energy in Thailand
Educational institutions established in 1998
1998 establishments in Thailand
Environmental organizations based in Thailand
Energy education